Reiko Mori may refer to:
Reiko Mori, birth name of Noriko Sengoku (1922–2012), Japanese actress
Reiko Mori (novelist) (1928–2014), Japanese novelist who won the 82nd Akutagawa Prize in 1979
Reiko Mori (politician) (born 1968), Japanese politician who is serving in the Wakayama Prefectural Assembly

See also
Reiko Ōmori